Portsmouth Harbour railway station is a railway station in Portsmouth, England.  It is situated beside Gunwharf Quays in the city's harbour, and is an important transport terminal, with a bus interchange and ferry services to Gosport and the Isle of Wight.  The station currently has four platforms in use: numbered 1, 3, 4 and 5. It is managed by South Western Railway. Platform 2 is no longer in use, having been decommissioned in the early 1990s following major repair and refurbishment work to the pier that the platforms sit on. The station is located adjacent to Portsmouth Harbour between the Gunwharf Quays shopping centre and the Historic Dockyard. Unusually for a mainline railway station, it is built over water as the station was originally constructed on wooden piles, which were later replaced by iron supports.

History 

The station opened on the 2nd October 1876 as the terminus of Chief Engineers Frederick Banister's Portsmouth Waterside Extension to the Portsmouth Direct Line, which runs between this station and London Waterloo station. The construction of the station superseded an earlier pier on the site called the Albert Pier that was used for passenger steamships in the mid-Victorian era.

The station was rebuilt in 1937 when the route was electrified but was almost totally destroyed during World War II by fire after German bombing, then rebuilt after the war.

A short branch line built on piles used to connect the station to the neighbouring dockyard, but this was taken out of service when a German bomb damaged the swing bridge in 1941.

Accidents and incidents
c.1928, T9 class locomotive No. 337 was derailed on the approach to the station, blocking all lines.

Services 

The station is served by a number of train operators. South Western Railway operate two services to London Waterloo, one on the Portsmouth Direct Line (via Guildford) and the other via Fareham, Winchester and Basingstoke.  They also operate local trains to Southampton Central.

There are train services along the West Coastway route, operated by Southern to Brighton, Littlehampton, Gatwick Airport, East Croydon and London Victoria. Great Western Railway operate trains via Southampton, Salisbury and Bristol Temple Meads to Cardiff Central, via the Wessex Main Line.

The ferry from Portsmouth Harbour Station to Ryde on the Isle of Wight is operated by Wightlink.  National Rail tickets between the Isle of Wight and stations on Great Britain include travel on the ferry.

The Monday-Saturday off peak rail service in trains per hour (tph) and trains per day (tpd) is as follows:  
Southern
1tph to Brighton (East Sussex)
1tpd to London Victoria via Horsham
Great Western Railway
1tph to Cardiff Central via Bristol Temple Meads and Southampton Central
South Western Railway
2tph to London Waterloo via Guildford
1tph to London Waterloo via Fareham and Eastleigh
1tph to Southampton Central

Former services
The station was served by Virgin CrossCountry until May 2003 with services to and from Liverpool and Manchester with InterCity 125 sets and in its last years, Class 220 Voyagers and Class 221 Super Voyagers.

The station was also served by Wessex Trains with one train a day to and from Penzance, as well as the services that are now run by its successor Great Western Railway.

Future

With the award of the South West Region franchise to South Western Railway in 2017, Portsmouth City Council announced the intention to "spruce up" the station as part of a £90 Million investment by the new operating company. Potential improvements could include a direct walking route in to the Gunwharf Quays shopping complex.

References

External links 

Railway stations in Portsmouth
DfT Category C1 stations
Former Portsmouth and Ryde Joint Railway stations
Railway stations in Great Britain opened in 1876
Railway stations served by Great Western Railway
Railway stations served by Govia Thameslink Railway
Railway stations served by South Western Railway
Railway stations serving harbours and ports in the United Kingdom